Essaïd  is an Arabic male given name or surname.  People with the name include:

Essaïd Abelouache (born 1988), Moroccan racing cyclist
Essaïd Belkalem (born 1989), Algerian football (soccer) player
Mustapha Essaïd (born 1970), Moroccan-born French runner

See also

Sa‘id, a male Arabic given name